State Road 710 (SR 710) is a  northwest-southeast route connecting SR 70 near Okeechobee, three miles (5 km) from the northern tip of Lake Okeechobee in south central Florida, to Old Dixie Highway (CR 811) in Riviera Beach. Near the middle of the highway, where Indiantown is located, the route is also known as Warfield Boulevard, named after S. Davies Warfield, the president of the Seaboard Air Line Railroad who originally built the adjacent railroad tracks.

Route description

The Bee-Line Highway traverses the woodlands and wetlands north and east of Lake Okeechobee, with an occasional farm near its northwestern end. It is a popular truck route that is used as an alternative to US 441/US 98/SR 700. Along the way, SR 710 passes through Indiantown (near the St. Lucie Canal and midway along the Bee Line stretch) and West Palm Beach.

History
The road was first built in 1924 by New York businessman William "Fingy" Conners as a toll road to carry people to his properties at Okeechobee and Connersville.

For a year in the 1940s, Bee Line Highway was part of State Road 66 before the number was changed to 710.

Major intersections

References

External links

State highways in Florida
State Roads in Okeechobee County, Florida
State Roads in Martin County, Florida
State Roads in Palm Beach County, Florida
Dixie Highway